The Championship Tour was a co-headlining concert tour by the independent record label Top Dawg Entertainment. The tour featured artists Kendrick Lamar, SZA, ScHoolboy Q, Jay Rock, Ab-Soul, Sir, and Lance Skiiiwalker. The tour began in Vancouver on May 4, 2018, and concluded in Burgettstown on June 16, 2018.

Background
Top Dawg Entertainment announced their first ever record label tour to promote major releases from 2017 and 2018 with Lamar's Damn, SZA's Ctrl, Sir's November, and their collaborative Black Panther soundtrack.

Set list
The set list is from the concert on May 4, 2018, in Vancouver, Canada. It is not intended to represent all tour dates.

SiR
"War"
"I Know"
"D'Evils"

Jay Rock
"Easy Bake"
"Vice City"

Ab-Soul
"Terrorist Threats"

ScHoolboy Q
"That Part"
"What They Want"
"Studio"
"Dope Dealer"
"Something Foreign" 
"Hell of a Night"
"Collard Greens"
"Break the Bank"
"John Muir"
"Man of the Year"

SZA
"Supermodel"
"Broken Clocks"
"Go Gina"
"Drew Barrymore"
"Aftermath"
"Doves in the Wind"
"Wavy"
"Garden (Say It Like Dat)"
"Love Galore"
"The Weekend"

Kendrick Lamar
"DNA."
"ELEMENT."
"King Kunta"
"Untitled 07  2014–2016"
"Goosebumps"
"New Freezer"
"Swimming Pools (Drank)"
"Backseat Freestyle"
"LOYALTY."
"Money Trees" 
 "King's Dead" 
 "LUST."
"XXX."
"M.A.A.D City"
"Love" 
 X 
 All The Stars 
"Bitch, Don't Kill My Vibe"
"Alright"
"HUMBLE."

Shows

Notes

References

External links

2018 concert tours
Co-headlining concert tours
Concert tours of North America
Concert tours of the United States
Concert tours of Canada
Kendrick Lamar